Ben Glardon (born November 13, 1954) was a Republican member of the Michigan House of Representatives.

Prior to his election to the Legislature, Glardon was president of Glardon Auction Service. He has been a licensed Realtor since 1983.

References

Living people
1954 births
Republican Party members of the Michigan House of Representatives
American real estate brokers
Businesspeople from Michigan
People from Owosso, Michigan
21st-century American politicians